The 2007 Red Bull Air Race World Series was the fifth Red Bull Air Race World Series season.

New pilots
Sergey Rakhmanin of Russia and Austrian Hannes Arch were chosen to join the 2007 series after completing a qualification course in October 2006, held in Arizona, United States. This takes the number of pilots to 13.

Race calendar
Three locations more were added to the race calendar in 2007, extending the number of rounds from 9 to 12. However, only 10 races were run due to cancellation of the legs in Barcelona, Spain and Acapulco, Mexico. The first race was held on April 6 in Abu Dhabi, United Arab Emirates and the last one was on November 3 in Perth, Australia.

Standings and results

Legend:
 DNS: Did not show

Mike Mangold won on countback over Paul Bonhomme. Both pilots had the same number of points, first, second, third and fifth places, resulting in the results of qualification being taken into account.

Aircraft

References

External links

 Red Bull Air Race official website
 Photography from 2007 season

Red Bull Air Race World Championship seasons
Red Bull Air Race
Red Bull Air Race World Series